Răzvan Florin Fodor is a Romanian singer and actor, and TV personality. He was born on June 22, 1975 in Bucharest, Romania. He was the lead singer for the Romanian rock group Krypton (also spelled Kripton) from 2000 to 2006, as well as being a well-known actor on Romanian television.

About
Răzvan Fodor studied at the Academia de Educatie Fizica si Sport, specializing in [gymnastics].

Fodor is a regular on Romanian TV, especially in Romanian soap operas such as Pacatele Evei in which he played the role of Alex Damian. He also had a minor role in the film Milionari de weekend in 2004 starring Romanian actress Catalin Saizescu. He has since been on other Romanian TV programs such as Daria, iubirea mea (2006) and Om sarac, om bogat (2006) 

In 2000, Fodor joined the former Romanian rock band Krypton. Formed in 1983, Krypton was more noted for its heavy metal style of rock. With Fodor on vocals, the band shifted from heavy metal to a more rock/pop orientation. The result was immediate commercial success in the Romanian music market. The CD album Comercial, released in 2001, featured the video hits Inima mea (My heart), Spune-mi cu ce am gresit (Tell me what I did wrong), and Iti mai aduci aminte (Do you remember?). In 2002, Krypton released their second CD album to feature Fodor on vocals, Stresat de timp (Streets of time). A video for the song Cerceii tai (Your earrings) from that album was released in June 2002 and received extensive airplay via MTV Romania.

In 2004, Krypton signed with Cat Music/Media Services and released their third album with Fodor in December entitled Deasupra Lumii. By the beginning of 2005, Lasa-mi speranta (Give me hope), the first video release from the album, became an immediate hit in Romania and Europe. Fodor was given notice by the European music community for his lead vocals for the song. "Lasa-mi speranta" became an MTV European favorite during 2005.

SpotlightNews reported that Fodor was once engaged to marry famous Romanian model, Catrinel Menghia, but according to the website she married ex-football player Massimo Brambati in Milan in the fall of 2005.

According to Monden Info, Fodor left Krypton in November 2005 to form a new band ("Fodor renunta la Krypton si isi face trupa noua") as well as to enhance his acting career, especially in Romanian television soap operas (called "novelas".)

Fodor will appear in the upcoming Romanian movie #selfie  due out in September 2016. He also was chosen to provide the voice of narrator in the Romanian translation of the animated movie The Grinch.

Discography

CD / Albums

Video Singles
 Inima Mea (2001) (KRYPTON)
 Spune-mi cu ce am gresit (2001) (KRYPTON)
 Iti mai aduci aminte (2001) (KRYPTON)
 Cerceii Tai (June 2002) (KRYPTON)
 Am dansat cu norii (2002) (KRYPTON)
 Lasa-mi speranta (2005) (KRYPTON)
 Pacatele Evei (with Lili Sandu) (2006)
 Vise de fum (2007)
 Furtuna in sufletul meu (2007) (with KRYPTON)
 Vad iubire (2010)

Music Singles
 Inima Mea (2001) (KRYPTON)
 Spune-mi cu ce am gresit (2001) (KRYPTON)
 Iti mai aduci aminte (2001) (KRYPTON)
 Cerceii Tai (June 2002) (KRYPTON)
 Am dansat cu norii (2002) (KRYPTON)
 Lasa-mi speranta (2005) (KRYPTON)
 Pacatele Evei (with Lili Sandu) (2006)
 Vise de fum (2007)
 Vad iubire (2010)
 Ceva bun (Paula Seling & Razvan Fodor) (2013)

Filmography
 Milionari de weekend (2004) Romanian Movie - character: Vasi
 Daria, iubirea mea (2006) Romanian TV Series - character: Tavi Dumitrescu
 Om sarac, om bogat (2006) Romanian TV Series - character: Banderas
 Pacatele Evei (2006) Romanian TV Series
 Ingerasii (2008) Romanian TV Series
 Aniela (2009) Romanian TV Series - character: Zeno Vulturesco
 MasterChef România (2012) TV Show MasterChef România (season 1) - Presenter / Host
 Pariu cu viața (sezon 3) (2012) - Robert Calin

References 
 Article by Roxana Ancuta (02 Nov 2004)
 Article Razvan Fodor(Krypton)

External links 
 
 Pacateli Evei Official Site https://web.archive.org/web/20070702123443/http://www.pacateleevei.ro/actori.php?actor=17&show=cv
 Discography information - Raluca Moisa 1 October 2005 https://web.archive.org/web/20070927230638/http://regional.9am.ro/stiri-revista-presei/Monden/19643/Telenovela-Krypton
 Record Company Discograph information https://web.archive.org/web/20071008110151/http://www.cat-music.ro/home.php?identifier=krypton
 https://web.archive.org/web/20080323233113/http://musicmix.rol.ro/artisti/bio/Krypton/index.htm

1975 births
Living people
Television people from Bucharest
Romanian male actors
Romanian male pop singers
21st-century Romanian male singers
21st-century Romanian singers
Musicians from Bucharest